Pterostylis jonesii, commonly known as the montane leafy greenhood, is a plant in the orchid family Orchidaceae and is endemic to a small area of south-eastern Australia. Individual plants have either a rosette of three to six leaves or a flowering spike with up to eleven flowers and five to seven stem leaves. The flowers are translucent green with faint darker green lines and have a brownish-yellow labellum with a dark stripe.

Description
Pterostylis jonesii, is a terrestrial,  perennial, deciduous, herb with an underground tuber. Flowering occurs from August to November.

Taxonomy and naming
This greenhood was first formally described in 2006 by David Jones who gave it the name Bunochilus montanus and published the description in Australian Orchid Research. In 2007 Gary Backhouse changed the name to Pterostylis jonesii, rather than Pterostylis montana because that name was already in use for a New Zealand endemic. The specific epithet (jonesii) honours David Jones who published the original description.

Distribution and habitat
The montane leafy greenhood is only known from forest in the higher areas of north-eastern Victoria and southern New South Wales.

References

jonesii
Orchids of New South Wales
Orchids of Victoria (Australia)
Endemic orchids of Australia
Plants described in 2006